Darrell Pollock (born July 23, 1961) is an American politician and businessman who served as a member of the Missouri House of Representatives for the 146th district from 2005 to 2012.

Background 
Pollock attended the University of Central Missouri. Elected in 2004, he assumed office in 2005. Pollock also owns and operates a small business. Pollock's wife, Suzie Pollock, was elected to the Missouri House in 2018. They have two children and live in Lebanon, Missouri.

References 

Living people
1961 births
Republican Party members of the Missouri House of Representatives
Businesspeople from Missouri
People from Lebanon, Missouri